Kommunar is the name of several inhabited localities in Russia.

Urban localities
Kommunar, Gatchinsky District, Leningrad Oblast, a town under the administrative jurisdiction of Kommunarskoye Settlement Municipal Formation in Gatchinsky District of Leningrad Oblast

Rural localities
Kommunar, Republic of Bashkortostan, a village in Kaltovsky Selsoviet of Iglinsky District in the Republic of Bashkortostan
Kommunar, Bryansk Oblast, a settlement in Dobrikovsky Rural Administrative Okrug of Brasovsky District in Bryansk Oblast; 
Kommunar, Republic of Khakassia, a selo in Kommunarovsky Selsoviet of Shirinsky District in the Republic of Khakassia
Kommunar, Kostroma Oblast, a settlement in Soltanovskoye Settlement of Neysky District in Kostroma Oblast; 
Kommunar, Krasnodar Krai, a settlement in Novomikhaylovsky Rural Okrug of Kushchyovsky District in Krasnodar Krai; 
Kommunar, Belovsky District, Kursk Oblast, a settlement in Kommunarovsky Selsoviet of Belovsky District in Kursk Oblast
Kommunar, Sovetsky District, Kursk Oblast, a settlement in Sovetsky Selsoviet of Sovetsky District in Kursk Oblast
Kommunar, Kingiseppsky District, Leningrad Oblast, a village in Opolyevskoye Settlement Municipal Formation of Kingiseppsky District in Leningrad Oblast
Kommunar, Republic of Mordovia, a settlement in Starochamzinsky Selsoviet of Bolsheignatovsky District in the Republic of Mordovia
Kommunar, Pochinkovsky District, Nizhny Novgorod Oblast, a settlement in Naruksovsky Selsoviet of Pochinkovsky District in Nizhny Novgorod Oblast
Kommunar, Sharangsky District, Nizhny Novgorod Oblast, a village in Rozhentsovsky Selsoviet of Sharangsky District in Nizhny Novgorod Oblast
Kommunar, Samara Oblast, a settlement in Bolsheglushitsky District of Samara Oblast
Kommunar, Stavropol Krai, a settlement in Kommunarovsky Selsoviet of Krasnogvardeysky District in Stavropol Krai
Kommunar, Tyumen Oblast, a settlement in Kommunarovsky Rural Okrug of Isetsky District in Tyumen Oblast
Kommunar, Volgograd Oblast, a settlement in Kommunarovsky Selsoviet of Leninsky District in Volgograd Oblast